Waldenmark, also known as the Edward Fischer House, is a historic house, studio, garage, and guesthouse located in Wrightstown Township, Bucks County, Pennsylvania. The house, studio, and garage were designed by architects Walter Gropius and Marcel Breuer and built in 1939.  The guesthouse was completed in 1948 and designed by Breuer. The main house is a two-level, flat roofed dwelling in the International Style.  It is a frame structure with redwood and stone sections.  It features curved walls, ribbon windows, and a freeform stone patio. The studio is a frame structure with redwood siding with a saltbox and shed roof profile. The guesthouse is a long two-story building with a cantilevered second floor and uneven gable roof. The complex was built for artist Edward L. Fischer and his wife Margrit, who were friends of Gropius and Breuer through Bauhaus.

It was added to the National Register of Historic Places in 2001.

References

Marcel Breuer buildings
Walter Gropius buildings
Houses on the National Register of Historic Places in Pennsylvania
Houses completed in 1939
Houses in Bucks County, Pennsylvania
National Register of Historic Places in Bucks County, Pennsylvania